Ascent Glacier is a glacier,  wide, flowing north to enter Argosy Glacier in the Miller Range just east of Milan Ridge. It was named by the New Zealand Geological Survey Antarctic Expedition (1961–62) who used this glacier to gain access to the central Miller Range.

See also
 Hockey Cirque
 List of glaciers in the Antarctic

References 

Glaciers of Oates Land